Pat Dapuzzo (born December 29, 1958) is a retired National Hockey League linesman, who wore uniform number 60. He officiated in the NHL from 1984–2008.

Biography
Dapuzzo grew up in North Bergen, New Jersey, where he went to Franklin Elementary School and attended St. Bridget's Church. As a boy, he could often be seen playing roller hockey on the street by the church with his friends. A great mystery to the people who knew him growing up in New Jersey was where he learned to skate well enough to officiate in the NHL. His officiating career began in the 1984–85 NHL season, only six years removed from graduating high school. He officiated 1,532 regular season games, 63 playoff games, and one All-Star Game. He also worked the 1991 Canada Cup.

Retirement
He retired after the 2007–08 NHL season, during which he was severely injured on February 9 when he was struck in the face with an ice skate. The accident occurred when the Philadelphia Flyers' Steve Downie, during the course of being checked into the boards, accidentally struck Dapuzzo in the face, causing ten different fractures in his face and cutting his nose from his face, which required forty stitches to reattatch. The injuries caused by the skate and skate blade would have been prevented if Dapuzzo had been wearing a visor at the time. Dapuzzo was a part-time scout for the Toronto Maple Leafs.

References

1958 births
Living people
National Hockey League officials
Sportspeople from Hoboken, New Jersey
Toronto Maple Leafs scouts